Eino Leino 2 is a 1980 studio album by Finnish musician Vesa-Matti Loiri.

The album has sold more than 50,000 copies and was certified gold in 1980 and platinum in 1987.

Track listing

References

1980 albums
Albums by Finnish artists